The 2007 Kisima Music Awards took place at Marula Manor, Nairobi, Kenya on 8 September 2007.

Winners

References
Kisima Award Winners
The Standard, September 14, 2007: Kisima Drama

External links
Kisima Awards

Kisima Music Award winners